Županje Njive is a settlement on the Kamnik Bistrica River in the Municipality of Kamnik in the Upper Carniola region of Slovenia.

Chapel-shrine

A chapel-shrine, dedicated to the Virgin Mary, stands in the village. It was built in 1908 and contains a statue of Our Lady of Lourdes, made by the sculptor Franc Ksaver Tončič from Kamnik. Since 1988, it has been rumoured to have miraculous powers and is visited by numerous pilgrims.

References

External links
Županje Njive on Geopedia

Populated places in the Municipality of Kamnik